HMS H42 was a British H class submarine that sank with the loss of all 24 of its crew after an accidental collision in 1922. The sub was  built by Armstrong Whitworth, Newcastle Upon Tyne. She was laid down in September 1917 and was commissioned on 1 May 1919.

On 23 March 1922, under the command of Royal Navy Lieutenant Douglas Staley, H42 was practising torpedo attacks against British destroyers steaming off Europa Point, Gibraltar, when she surfaced unexpectedly only 30  or 120 yards (27 or 110 metres) – sources differ – ahead of the destroyer . Versatile, making 20 knots, went to full speed astern on her engines and put her helm over hard to port, but had not yet begun to answer her helm when she rammed H42 abaft the conning tower, almost slicing the submarine in half. H42 sank with the loss of all hands. An investigation found H42 at fault for surfacing where she did against instructions.

Design

H42 was fitted with an anti-aircraft gun and four  torpedo tubes. Its torpedo tubes were fitted to the bows and the submarine was loaded with eight  torpedoes. It is a Holland 602 type submarine but was designed to meet Royal Navy specifications. Its complement was twenty-two crew members.

References

Bibliography
 
 Richardson, Alexander and Archibald Hurd. (editors). Brassey's Naval and Shipping Annual 1923. London, William Clowes, 1923.

 

British H-class submarines
Ships built on the River Tyne
1918 ships
World War I submarines of the United Kingdom
Royal Navy ship names
Submarines sunk in collisions
Shipwrecks in the Mediterranean Sea
Maritime incidents in 1922
Ships built by Armstrong Whitworth
Warships lost with all hands

pl:HMS H41